John Palmer was a priest who worked as a missionary for the Anglican Church in Melanesia. 

Palmer was born at Woodstock, Oxfordshire and baptised on 19 November 1837. He was educated at St John's College, Auckland and ordained in 1867. He was a missionary on Norfolk Island from 1863, head of the Melanesian Mission from 1892, and Archdeacon of Southern Melanesia from 1894. He died in 1902.

References

Anglican missionaries in Norfolk Island
19th-century Anglican priests
20th-century Anglican priests
People educated at St John's College, Auckland
People from Oxfordshire
1837 births
1902 deaths
Archdeacons of Southern Melanesia
Anglican missionaries in the Solomon Islands
Anglican missionaries in Vanuatu
English Anglican missionaries
English emigrants to New Zealand